Dee Snider's Strangeland: Seven Sins is a 2007–2008 comic book limited series prequel based on the 1998 Dee Snider film Strangeland.

Publication history
Dee Snider's Strangeland: Seven Sins was announced as a monthly four-issue comic book limited series by Fangoria Comics. The first issue was released on August, 29 2007. Due to the sudden closing of Fangoria Comics, the remaining three issues went unreleased.

Dee Snider's Strangeland: Seven Sins will be re-released by The Scream Factory sometime in 2008 in its complete four-issue format, allowing readers to complete the series for the very first time.

Only one comic was ever printed and sold to the public, because Fangoria comics either went out of business or decided to not publish the rest of the issues in the series.  As of 2012 there have been no updates on the future publishing of the rest of the series.  Due to being such a limited comic it often sells for over cover price on eBay.

Plot synopsis
The terrifying tale of how Carleton Hendricks becomes the merciless Captain Howdy, and the sadistic path of revenge he takes against the seven individuals responsible.

Film

Dee Snider's Strangeland: Seven Sins is a prequel to the 1998 Dee Snider film Strangeland

Notes

References

Comics based on films